TKİ Tavşanlı Linyitspor is a Turkish sports club located in Tavşanlı, Kütahya Province. The football club plays in the Turkish Regional Amateur League. In 2009–2010 season of second league, they promoted to Bank Asya 1.Lig after play-off matches.

Current squad

References

External links
TKİ Tavşanlı Linyitspor on TFF.org

 
Football clubs in Turkey
Association football clubs established in 1943
1943 establishments in Turkey